Narsinghpur, also known as Pandeypur, is a village located in Uttar Pradesh, India. It is situated 15 km away from sub-district headquarters, Zamania, and 40 km away from district headquarters, Ghazipur. It was a part of Daudpur until 1980, when it became recognized as an independent village. Narsinghpur has a total population of 503,000 (recorded in 2011) and is known for its fertile land.

References

1850 establishments in India
Villages in Ghazipur district